Pleaman Forsey is a Canadian politician, who was elected to the Newfoundland and Labrador House of Assembly in the 2019 provincial election. He represents the electoral district of Exploits as a member of the Newfoundland and Labrador Progressive Conservative Party. He was re-elected in the 2021 provincial election.

He is the brother of Clayton Forsey, who represented the same district in the legislature from 2005 to 2015.

Election results

References

Living people
Progressive Conservative Party of Newfoundland and Labrador MHAs
21st-century Canadian politicians
Year of birth missing (living people)